Itá is a city and a district located along the 35th kilometer of Ruta 1 in the Central Department of Paraguay.

Etymology
Its name means "stone" in the sweet Guaraní, also known as the "Capital of Ceramics". 
According to other derives from the landscape that is love of the hills in the background that every ston

Weather
The maximum temperature in summer reaches 40 °C, at times. The minimum in winter is 0 °C. The average in the central department is 22 °C. It is located in one of the departments in which rainfall is most abundant from January to April and scarcer from June to August.

Demography
Itá has a total of 81,084 inhabitants, of whom 40,708 were males and 40,377 females, according to projections from the Directorate General of Statistics, Census and Surveys.

History

Founded in 1539 Governor Domingo Martínez de Irala, a town inhabited by natural Guaraní.  It is a district since 1884. 
Itá begins with a mestizo population with customs and traditions, turning with the passage of time very original, which were gradually lost, not to be disseminated or lack of knowledge, why are not valued or transmitted to its fair measure .

Itá is known and regarded as the city's "pitcher and honey" because in times of reducing the Franciscan Friar Thomas Aquinas was dedicated to teaching women instead of a new way of livelihood which was preparing of the vessels that gave the name of pitcher made of mud.

The production of honey cane emerges from the first settlers.

History of the Itá Lagoon 
According to some residents of the city of Itá, which in wartime large armies that passed through that place an elderly woman who lived in the interior of his house had a well, the soldiers called thirsty to drink water and the old woman refused to give not only them but everyone who asked to drink and then fell into a flood, which flooded the entire house until they formed a lagoon. 
There is another story relates that within that gap is a bell buried gold, so that the invaders of wartime not carry as a trophy of war.

Communities
{| class="wikitable sortable"
|- bgColor="#ffffff"
!Name || width="200" align="right" | Population 
|-------
|Yjhovy ||1435
|-
|Potrero Po’i ||2046
|-
|Itá Potrero ||1063
|-
|Valle Jo’a ||245 
|-
|Oculto Chircaty ||780
|-
|Arrua’i ||2833	
|-
|Curupicayty ||1468	
|-
|Peguaho ||1289
|-
|Jhugua Ñaró ||1185
|-
|Calle Ybaté ||1185
|-
|Calle Po’i ||193
|-
|Tapé Tuyá ||497
|-
|Posta Gaona ||1591
|-
|Aveiro ||2033
|-
|Caaguazu'i ||2204
|-
|Caraguataity ||286
|-
|Las Piedras ||2507
|}

Itá neighborhoods

{| class="wikitable sortable"
|- bgColor="#ffffff"
! Name
|-
| Neighborhood San Blas 
|-
| Neighborhood Sportivo 
|-
| Neighborhood Cerro Corá 
|-
| Neighborhood San Antonio 
|-
| Neighborhood Villa Rossana I and II 
|-
| Neighborhood Paranambu  
|-
| Neighborhood San Cayetano 
|-
| Neighborhood San Miguel 
|}

Economy
Residents of Itá engaged in agriculture and pottery, and lately also to trade the adventure tourism (in the company Arruaí) in addition to the  very peculiar characteristics are the use of black pottery.

Transportation
Itá  is far 37 kilometers from Asunción, on Route I Mariscal Francisco Solano López, another route is widely used to reach the so-called "Southern Access".

From Itá, for a detour of Route you can reach Itauguá already Guarambaré.

Tourism
The city is one of the most significant reductions Franciscan. The people of Itá retain this feature in their habits: development of handicrafts in manufacture of ceramics and baskets. 
Visit and tour of the market, tourism gastronomic seafood meal on the market only in the country for its flavor and characteristics.

In San Blas Craft Center located on Route I, in the city centre, is the permanent exhibition of pottery, ceramics Guaraní-Hispanic, pitchers, blankets and other excellent work.

Residents also engaged in the manufacture of beautiful cloth dolls.

The lagoon Itá, "Acosta Ñú Martyrs " which has never dried, is a very peculiar place.

In the Cerro Arrúa'i cave is a mysterious and beautiful resorts on the Arroyo Paranambú.

In addition, the Church of San Blas is a Franciscan church dating from 1698, considered historical relic.
You can make adventure tourism (Hunting, Fishing, safari photos, centered, the path of former Mariscal Lopez) in the company Arruai camps and stays in place.

Notable people

 Potter, Rosa Brítez, declared "Potter of América" for her work.
 Ceramists Juana Marta Rodas and Julia Isídrez, creditor Dutch "Prince Claus Award" for their work.
 Marciana Rojas
 Gregoria Benítez
 Estanislao Agüero
 Celso Felipe Benítez
 Mercedes Servín
 Fredy Fretes
 Familia Jiménez
 Professor Celso Bazán with the conservatory Herminio Gimenez.
 Elvis Marecos, professional footballer

Personality
 Jorge Guasch (b. 1961)

References
 Illustrated Geography of Paraguay, SRL Distributed Arami, 2007. 
 Geography of Paraguay, First Edition 1999, Publisher Hispanic Paraguay SRL.

External links
 National Secretary of Tourism

Populated places in the Central Department